Szczecin pumps, colloquially known as Berliners, are historic water pumps in Szczecin, Poland, that are a characteristic object of the city. There were 70 pumps originally made between 1865 and 1895, with 28 surviving to this day, 27 of which hold the status of cultural property.

History 
The pumps were manufactured between 1865 and 1895, in the F. Poepck Water Pump factories located in Szczecin and Chojna. Originally, there were around 70 pumps made, of which 28 survive to this day. Originally, the pumps were painted in blue with colorful details depicting the city coat of arms. After World War 2, they were repainted to a green colour. In the first years after the war, the pumps were very useful for the city inhabitants as the water supply network remained not fully functional at the time. At that time, the elements from damaged pumps were relocated to the working ones. At the beginning of the 21st century, the pumps were repainted to their original colours.

In 2000, thanks to a city conservator-restorer, Małgorzata Gwiazdowska, 27 of the pumps were listed as cultural property. By the 2010s, all pumps required restoration to their original state, as they were damaged, and decorative details of the pumps had been stolen over the years. Polcast foundry, in cooperation with West Pomeranian University of Technology, was tasked by the Szczecin Department of Water Supply and Sewage to prepare the copies of missing decorative elements. Such copies were made using both traditional methods used in the original manufacturing and modern technologies, such as computer modeling. In 2013, the department was given 25,000 Polish złoty from the city for the restoration efforts.

Many of the pumps no longer work, due to the lowering of the groundwater levels in the 2000s.

Currently, the pumps are a characteristic object of the city, and are popular among tourists.

Description 
The pumps are made of iron and have a form of almost 3 metre (9.8 ft.) high column with diameter of 36 cm (14.2 in) and base in the shape of the square with the side dimensions of 61 cm (24 in). They are painted in a blue colour with a yellow crown placed at the top and red, yellow and blue coat of arms of Szczecin at the bottom. They were originally painted as such in 19th century, and after World War 2, they were repainted to a green colour. At the beginning of the 21st century, the pumps were repainted to their original colours. Water is discharged from the sculpture of a dragon.

The pumps are independent from the city water supply network, with the water being pumped with hand lever. Many of the pumps don't work anymore, due to the lowering of the groundwater levels in the 2000s. They are under the administration and maintenance of the Szczecin Department of Water Supply and Sewage.

The pumps are colloquially known as Berliners, as they are the same model as the historical water pumps in the city of Berlin, Germany.

There are currently 28 in the city, located at:
 Piątego Lipca Street/Noakowskiego Street
 Bazarowa Street
 Bohaterów Getta Warszawskiego Street/Zgody Square
 Cieszkowskiego Street/Bojki Street
 Grodzka Street/Mariacka Street
 Tkacka Street/Grodzka Street
 Heleny Street/Karpińskiego Street
 Papieża Jana Pawła II Street/Mazurska Street
 Kaszubska Street/Narutowicza Street
 Kopernika Street/Krzywoustego Street
 Królowej Jadwigi Street/Krzywoustego Street 
 Bogusława X Street/Łokietka Street
 8 Malczewskiego Street in Żeromski Park
 55 Małopolska Street
 Monte Cassino Street/Jagiellońska Street
 Mściwoja Street at Sienny Market
 Niepodległości Avenue
 Edmunda Bałuki Street/Św. Wojciecha Street at Anders Park
 Piastów Street/Szarych Szeregów Square
 Śląska Street/Grunwaldzki Square
 Św. Piotra i Pawła Street near the Castle Way
 Zawiszy Czarnego Square/3 Maja Aveneu
 Żołnierza Polskiego Square at 13 Muz
 Potulicka Street/Drzymały Street near the First Tax Office
 Wyzwolenia Aveneu/Felczaka Street
 Odzieżowa Street/Wyzwolenia Aveneu
 Wyzwolenia Aveneu/Rayskiego Street
 Żupańskiego Street/Niemierzyńska Street

Notes

References

Bibliography 
Andrzej Kraśnicki, Jr. Szczecin w szczególe. Szczecin. Walkowska Wydawnictwo / Jeż. 2008. ISBN 978-83-924983-8-4.

Buildings and structures in Szczecin
Pumps